James Frederick Leckman, M.D., is a child psychiatrist and psychoanalyst and the Neison Harris Professor of Child Psychiatry, Psychiatry, Psychology and Pediatrics at the Yale School of Medicine, recognized for his research in Tourette syndrome (TS) and obsessive–compulsive disorder (OCD).

Personal life and education
Leckman obtained degrees in chemistry and philosophy from the College of Wooster in 1969,  and his MD from the University of New Mexico School of Medicine in 1973.

Leckman is married to Hannah Hone Leckman; they have two children.

Career
After interning in San Francisco at the United States Public Health Service Marine Hospital for two years (1973–1974), Leckman worked at the National Institute of Mental Health (NIMH) in adult psychiatry (1974–1976), before completing his residency in psychiatry at Yale School of Medicine in 1979.

At Yale since 1979, he took several sabbaticals to study elsewhere, including a 1998 study of animal behavior at the University of Cambridge. He was Director of Research for the Yale Child Study Center (1983–2010), where his interests include the study of the interplay between genetic and epigenetic factors in human development and Darwinism in psychopathology.

According to a profile of featured researchers by the Mental Health Research Association (NARSAD):Very few people have the clinical, research and teaching experience, the empathy for the human condition, and the curiosity Dr. Leckman has to explore such a fundamental question as human attachment. He is a world-renowned child psychiatrist and patient-oriented clinical investigator with unique expertise in the evaluation of Tourette's syndrome and early-onset obsessive-compulsive disorder.

Leckman is an international leader in Tourette syndrome research, and as of 2013, was the highest publisher on the topic.

Appointments, awards, affiliations and recognition
Leckman serves as an associate editor for the Journal of Child Psychology and Psychiatry and served as a deputy editor of the Journal of the American Academy of Child and Adolescent Psychology.

Leckman is frequently named as one of America's best doctors by peers, and has received the following awards and recognition:

 Blanche E. Ittleson Award for Research in Child Psychiatry, 1995, from the American Psychiatric Association.
 Outstanding Research Mentor, awarded five times, from the American Academy of Child and Adolescent Psychiatrists. 
 Fellows of the American Psychiatric Association,  American Academy of Child Adolescent Psychology, and American College of Neuropsychopharmacology. 
 Member of the American College of Psychiatrists since 1991.
 Distinguished alumni award, College of Wooster.

Publications

As of 2005, Leckman had authored or co-authored more than 250 professional articles, 115 book chapters, and was the author of seven books as of 2012.  In 2002, he was named a "Highly Cited Researcher" by the American Society for Information Science and Technology.

His books include:
 Tourette's Syndrome -- Tics, Obsessions, Compulsions: Developmental Psychopathology and Clinical Care,  
 Pediatric Psychopharmacology: Principles and Practice, 
 Tourette's Syndrome and Tic Disorders: Clinical Understanding and Treatment,

References

Alumni of the University of Cambridge
American psychiatrists
College of Wooster alumni
Tourette syndrome
University of New Mexico alumni
Yale School of Medicine alumni
Yale School of Medicine faculty
Living people
Year of birth missing (living people)